Ghosthunting.dk is a Danish group that investigates reported paranormal activity. The group is based in Jutland, and most of their investigations center on locations in Jutland. They do, however, occasionally investigate locations on other parts of Denmark. In 2013, Ghosthunting.dk, along with another group called Dansk Parapsykologisk Aspekt, became the main subject of the reality show Spøgelsesjægerne.

Structure and methods
Ghosthunting.dk is led by Thomas Andersen who supervises all activities by the group's ordinary members. One ordinary member holds the title of 'researcher' and is responsible for gathering information on the locations investigated prior to the investigation. That role was held by Harriet Wraa, whose exit from the group was depicted in an episode of Spøgelsesjægerne.

The group makes use of methods typically associated with ghost hunting such as EMF meters, digital camera surveillance, EVP-recorders, and ghost boxes, as well as attempts at interacting with paranormal phenomena. Ghosthunting.dk typically make available recorded material from their investigations on their homepage - typically longer video clips and interesting audio recordings - offering their analyses and inviting the readers to make their own interpretations.

Media coverage
The group has been covered in various Danish media including national and local TV networks, national and local radio networks, and regional and national newspapers and magazines. The group gained national fame when they became the main subject of the reality show Spøgelsesjægerne, which was aired on Kanal 5 in 2013, which depicted both aspects of the group's investigations and the private lives of the individual members. Famously, the group's researcher Harriet Wraa was dismissed from the group in the fifth episode. On their Facebook page, several members of Ghosthunting.dk have expressed their dissatisfaction with the editing of Spøgelsesjægerne, arguing that a lot of important information is left out and that there is too much focus on the members' private lives and too little focus on the ghost hunting itself in the series.

References

External links

Paranormal investigators